Elvis (also known as Elvis: The Miniseries or Elvis: The Early Years) is a 2005 biographical CBS miniseries written by Patrick Sheane Duncan and directed by James Steven Sadwith. It chronicles the rise of American music icon Elvis Presley from his high school years to his international superstardom.

The cast includes Irish actor Jonathan Rhys Meyers as Elvis, Rose McGowan as Ann-Margret, Randy Quaid as "Colonel" Tom Parker, Camryn Manheim as Gladys Presley, Robert Patrick as Vernon Presley, Tim Guinee as Sam Phillips, Jack Noseworthy as Steve Binder, Antonia Bernath as Priscilla Presley, Stuart Greer as Captain Beaulieu, Clay Steakley as Bill Black, Mark Adam as Scotty Moore, John Boyd West as Red West and Randy McDowell as Gene Smith.

Meyers won the Golden Globe Award for Best Actor – Miniseries or Television Film for his performance as Elvis Presley.

Cast
Jonathan Rhys Meyers as Elvis Presley
Rose McGowan as Ann-Margret
Randy Quaid as Colonel Tom Parker
Camryn Manheim as Gladys Presley
Robert Patrick as Vernon Presley
Tim Guinee as Sam Phillips
Jack Noseworthy as Steve Binder
Antonia Bernath as Priscilla Presley
Stuart Greer as Captain Beaulieu
Clay Steakley as Bill Black
Mark Adam as Scotty Moore
John Boyd West as Red West
Randy McDowell as Gene Smith
Jill Jane Clements as Marion Keisker

Awards and nominations

Home media
The mini-series is available on a region-free DVD and was made available August 14, 2007.

References

External links

  with very limited information
 

2000s American television miniseries
American biographical series
CBS original programming
Works about Elvis Presley
Films directed by James Steven Sadwith